The VAZ-2101 "Zhiguli", commonly nicknamed  "Kopeyka" (for the smallest Soviet coin, 1/100 of the Ruble), is a compact sedan car (small class, passenger car, model 1 in Soviet classification) produced by the Soviet manufacturer AvtoVAZ and introduced in 1970, the company's first product.

The car was a heavily modified and licence-built version of the Fiat 124 tailored for the Soviet Union and much of the Eastern Bloc.  Subsequently, it was widely exported to the West under the Lada brand. The station wagon version (correspondingly based on the Fiat 124 Familiare) was known as the VAZ-2102.

Development
The lightweight Italian Fiat 124, which had won the 1967 European Car of the Year, was adapted in order to survive treacherous Russian driving conditions. Among many changes, aluminium brake drums were added to the rear, and the original Fiat engine was dropped in favour of  a newer design made by NAMI. This new engine had a modern overhead camshaft design but was never used in Fiat cars. The suspension was raised to clear rough Russian roads and the bodyshell was made from thicker, heavier steel with reinforcement in key chassis areas after cracking was discovered during durability testing. The first Lada models were equipped with a starting handle in case the battery went flat in Siberian conditions, though this was later dropped. Another feature specifically intended to help out in cold conditions was a manual auxiliary fuel pump.

Some of the improvements developed by VAZ engineers were quietly applied by Fiat to the 124 in its final years of production - for example the chassis strengthening; internally within Fiat these updated models are denoted "124R", the "R" standing for 'Russian'.

Engines fitted to the original Lada 2101 start with the 1.2l. The drivetrain is a simple rear-wheel drive setup with a live rear axle. The engine is an inline four with two valves per cylinder and a single overhead camshaft.

History
The 2101 is a re-engineered version of the Fiat 124 produced under licence from Fiat and tailored for the nations of the Eastern Bloc, but was widely exported to the West as an economy car.  Although the facelifted and modernised VAZ-2105, 2104 & 2107 versions largely replaced it in the West in the early 1980s, it was still produced for the domestic market as late as 1988. Known as the Zhiguli (for the hills found near the plant) within the Soviet Union, the main differences between the VAZ-2101 and the Fiat 124 are the use of thicker gauge steel for the bodyshell, drum brakes on the rear wheels in place of disc brakes, and a bespoke engine. Early versions of the car featured a starting handle for cranking the engine manually should the battery go flat in Siberian winter conditions, and an auxiliary fuel pump.

Under the licensing agreement with Fiat, VAZ were forbidden from selling the car in Italy in order to protect Fiat's lucrative home market, nor was it permitted to sell it in any export market in competition with the 124; however, exports to Western Europe began in 1974 when the 124 was discontinued in favour of Fiat's newer 131 Mirafiori.  The 2101 was sold in export markets as the Lada 1200, Lada 1300, Lada 1200S and Lada 2101  until 1989; it was sold in the United Kingdom from May 1974, until the arrival of the Riva in 1983. It was the first Lada to be sold in the United Kingdom.

The first year, 22,000 were produced, and capacity reached 660,000 by 1973. Sales reached one million on 21 December 1973, and one and a half million in 1974.  In May 1974, it went on sale in Britain, priced at £979.

The 2101 was built, virtually unaltered, from 1970 until 1982. The slightly upgraded 21013 continued to be built until 1988.

Models

VAZ-2101

All these models had soft suspension adapted to the local roads that provided a very comfortable ride even on tough gravel roads. Early models included a crank, in case the battery went flat (an item later dropped) and an auxiliary fuel pump. In a short time Lada became a real hit in Soviet Union. The 2101 (and its first modifications) opened a new era in Russian motoring. Unfortunately, the Togliatti plant could not supply the consumer demand and people had to wait for years to get a chance to buy the car. Exports began 21 February 1971, to Yugoslavia, with 32 cars sent to Finland, Holland, and Belgium on 30 July. After a competition in the Soviet automotive magazine Za Rulyom (At the Wheel), which drew 1,812 entries, in September 1971 the name Lada (Russian for "harmony") was chosen, and the export models would be called Lada 1200s. Production was always behind demand, and price crept up, but by 1980, the wait for a new 2101 was down to a year. The 2102 estate version started production 27 April 1972. Sales to Cuba began in 1971 (and until 2006, Raúl Castro drove to work in his own saloon) and Canada in 1978, but none were exported to the U.S. Angola received its first one thousand Ladas in 1977, in time becoming a significant buyer.
21011 (1974–1981) — modified variant with a   engine. Further changes included self-adjusting drum brakes on the rear axle, also fitted to the VAZ-2101. Flat front indicator lenses instead of the dome-shaped ones on the VAZ-2101. The "horns", or over-riders, on the bumpers were removed and replaced with a rubber strip running the whole length of the bumper. The rear lights were also smoothed in a similar manner to the indicator lenses and the passive reflector (previously a separate part underneath the main rear lights) was incorporated as a small, square-shaped part in the rear light cluster itself. The windshield pump was moved down and was operated by foot (rather than by rubber button on the dashboard VAZ 2101, which was operated with the push of a finger). The dashboard had a wood-effect plastic trim; the horn was placed on the steering wheel cover. The front and rear seats became more comfortable. Material and colouring of the instrument panel was changed from the original black on light grey to white on black, the instrument panel lighting was altered as well. On the rear pillars there were rectangular ventilation holes with grille, which were not present on the VAZ-2101. Four horizontal oval holes for improved air flow to the radiator appeared on the front panel just above the front bumper. The export series were designated the Lada 1300.
21012--right-hand drive saloon with the  four, entered production 22 May 1973, for export to Japan, Australia, and Britain (which proved a very successful market).
21013 (1977–1988) — similar to VAZ-21011,  engine, exported as the Lada 1200 with an upgraded version (incorporating the exterior and dashboard changes introduced with the VAZ-21011) called Lada 1200S.
21014 estate, with the  four, entered production 22 May 1973, for export to Japan, Australia, and Britain (which proved a very successful market).
21016 (1976–1981) — special modification, only available to Soviet police,  engine (from VAZ-2103) in VAZ-21011 body.
21018 (1978) — first series rotary engine modification for Soviet police & KGB with one-rotor  VAZ-311 Wankel engine with electronic ignition and twin-electrode sparking plugs. It also featured a downdraft carburettor, with different jet sizes to the 2101, and two-stage aircleaner. Presented to the public by 1982. Only 250 built. Engine durability was an issue, wearing out at just . 
21019 Arkan (1983?) — second series rotary engine modification for Soviet police & KGB with two-rotor  VAZ-411 or VAZ-4132 Wankel engine.

VAZ-2102
The estate version of the VAZ-2101 (based on the Fiat 124 Familiare) was known as the 2102 and was available from 1971. It was replaced by the 2104 (Lada Riva in some markets) in 1985. Over 660,000 were built by end of production in 1986. In May 1974, it went on sale in Britain, priced at £979. 
 VAZ-2102 (1971–1986) — also known as Lada 1200 Combi (1200 ES Estate).
 VAZ-21021 (1974–1985) — equipped with  engine. Also known as Lada 1300 Combi. Export models got a rear washer/wiper.
 VAZ-21023 (1973–1985) — equipped with  engine. Also known as Lada 1500 Combi (1500 DL Estate). Export models got a rear washer/wiper. Lada 1500 Estate sales in the UK started in October 1977 and ended in October 1985 as the Lada 1500 DL Estate.

VAZ-2103

The 2103 (known in export markets as the Lada 1500) was very similar to the 2101, and had many common features with the Fiat 124 Special that was developed at the same time as the 2103, but with an external trim  closer to the larger and more upmarket Fiat 125. It can be identified by four headlights, a squarer appearance to the front grille, and a different interior. Some markets also received the VAZ-2106, or Lada 1600.

Technical specifications

Gallery

See also
Fiat 124
Lada
Vauxhall Viva HA

References

Compact cars
Cars of Russia
1980s cars
2101
Soviet automobiles
Italy–Soviet Union relations
First car made by manufacturer
Cars introduced in 1970
Sedans
Rear-wheel-drive vehicles
Cars discontinued in 1988